Ffynnon Llugwy is a lake in the Carneddau range of mountains in Snowdonia, North Wales.

Since the early twentieth century water has been taken from its outflow, Afon Llugwy to feed Llyn Cowlyd via a series of leats.

Since the mid 1970s the lake has additionally acted as a reservoir for Bangor and eastern Anglesey, which necessitated the laying of an 11-mile pipeline to the water treatment works at Mynydd Llandegai.

It is the source of the River Llugwy (Welsh: Afon Llugwy) which flows via Capel Curig and Betws-y-coed before becoming a tributary of the River Conwy.

References 

Capel Curig
Reservoirs in Conwy County Borough
Reservoirs in Snowdonia